Hibbertia argentea, commonly known as silver leaved guinea flower, is a species of flowering plant in the family Dilleniaceae and is endemic to Western Australia. The species was first formally described in 1845 by Ernst Gottlieb von Steudel in Lehmann's Plantae Preissianae. The specific epithet (argentea) means "silvery", referring to the colour of the leaves.

The species has a limited distribution through the Great Southern region of Western Australia between Cranbrook in the north, Gnowangerup in the east,  and Albany in the south and west. It is found on granite hills and rocky outcrops growing in clay-sand or rocky loam soils.

Hibbertia argentea is classified as "Priority Three" by the Government of Western Australia Department of Parks and Wildlife meaning that it is poorly known and known from only a few locations but is not under imminent threat.

See also
List of Hibbertia species

References

argentea
Flora of Western Australia
Plants described in 1845
Taxa named by Ernst Gottlieb von Steudel